Bolam Lake Country Park is a country park in Northumberland, England, near the village of Bolam and about  west of Morpeth. It is signposted off the A696 road from Belsay.

History
The lake and woodlands were laid out by John Dobson for Reverend John Beresford, Baron Decies, the owner of the Bolam estate, who wanted to provide work for local people during a period of economic decline. The project, started in 1816, took three years to complete. The site was landscaped, and designed to provide picturesque views of nearby features in the countryside. The lake was created from a swampy area known as Bolam Bog.

By 1945 the grounds had grown wild; in 1972 the estate was purchased by Northumberland County Council in order to create a country park.

Description
The park, area ; has a lake, woodlands and open grassland. There are walks throughout the park, including a fully accessible path around the lake.

Wildlife in the park includes roe deer and red squirrels; there are swans and other waterfowl on the lake. Woodland birds to be seen include great spotted woodpecker, bullfinch, nuthatch and treecreeper. 

There is a visitor centre and café next to the Boathouse Wood Car Park, to the north of the lake.

References

External links
 "Bolam Lake: A history of the area of Bolam" Leaflet by Northumberland County Council
 "Bolam Lake Country Park" GPS Cycle and Walking Routes
 "Bolam Lake" Looks Fishy

Country parks in Northumberland
Lakes of Northumberland
Forests and woodlands of Northumberland
Belsay